is a correctional facility in Naka-ku, Hiroshima. A part of the penal system of Japan, it is operated by the Ministry of Justice.

One of Japan's seven execution chambers is in this facility.

Notable prisoners
Hiroaki Hidaka, serial killer
Yasuaki Uwabe, mass murderer

References

Buildings and structures in Hiroshima
Prisons in Japan
Execution sites in Japan